Lan Jingxuan (born 16 September 1999) is a Chinese footballer who currently plays for China League Two club Quanzhou Yassin.

Club career
Lan Jingxuan was promoted to the senior team of Tianjin TEDA within the 2019 Chinese Super League season and he would make his debut on 30 April 2019 in a Chinese FA Cup game against Zibo Cuju F.C. in a 4-1 victory.

Career statistics

References

External links

1999 births
Living people
Chinese footballers
Association football defenders
Chinese Super League players
Tianjin Jinmen Tiger F.C. players